State Trunk Highway 93 (often called Highway 93, STH-93 or WIS 93) is a state highway in the U.S. state of Wisconsin. It runs north–south in west-central Wisconsin from near Holmen to Eau Claire.

Route description 
The first  of roadway runs concurrently with US 53. The route runs concurrently with WIS 54 for the next  until it reaches the intersection with WIS 35 in Centerville.

History
Starting in 1919, WIS 93 was formed to follow along part of its present-day route from WIS 25 (now WIS 35/WIS 54) in Centerville to WIS 53 (now WIS 95 and County Trunk Highway A [CTH-A]) west of Arcadia. In 1923, part of WIS 53 was moved south and extended northeastward, running from Arcadia to Neville instead of to Whitehall. As a result, WIS 93 extended northward to Eau Claire, superseding portions of WIS 53 from Arcadia to Independence and WIS 88 from Independence to Elk Creek. In 1934, WIS 93 extended southward towards Trempealeau and then eastward along superseded WIS 167 towards US 53/WIS 35 near Holmen.

In 1940, WIS 93 moved off from what is now McGilvray "Seven Bridges" Road (later signed as CTH-M/CTH-XA). As a result, it has to travel northward roughly along present-day and former CTH-M towards WIS 35 (now WIS 93)/WIS 54 west of Galesville. In 1953, a connection to US 53 near Holman was restored. 

In the mid-1980s, WIS 93 moved eastward to bypass Arcadia, swapping with CTH-A in the process. In 1990, a portion of WIS 93 switched places with a portion of WIS 35. As a result, WIS 93 served Galesville while WIS 35 served Trempealeau.

Major intersections

See also

References

External links

093
Transportation in La Crosse County, Wisconsin
Transportation in Trempealeau County, Wisconsin
Transportation in Eau Claire County, Wisconsin